The Apprentices is a 1995 French comedy film directed by Pierre Salvadori.

Selected Cast
 François Cluzet - Antoine
 Guillaume Depardieu - Fred
 Marie Trintignant - Lorette 
 Judith Henry - Sylvie
 Philippe Duquesne - Man in Flat 48

Plot 
Antoine is a failed and depressed writer. Fred doesn't do much in his life and seems to be happy about it. The two of them share an apartment and live in a shambles. The adventures and mostly the misadventures of these two buddies/losers, makes them realise that despite everything that happens their friendship is the most important thing in their lives.

References

External links 

1995 comedy films
1995 films
French comedy films
1990s French films